The 1989 season was the Dallas Cowboys' 30th in the National Football League (NFL), their first under the ownership of Jerry Jones, their 19th playing their home games at Texas Stadium and their first season under head coach Jimmy Johnson. It was the team's first time in franchise history that Tom Landry wasn't the head coach, as he was fired by Arkansas oil executive Jerry Jones on February 25, 1989. Landry served as Cowboys' head coach since the team's inaugural 1960 season and led the team to 5 Super Bowl appearances, winning 2 of them in his 29-year tenure.

They failed to improve on their 3–13 record from 1988, finishing at 1–15 and missing the playoffs for the fourth consecutive season.

Jimmy Johnson had compiled a 44–4 record in his last 4 years as coach of the University of Miami Hurricanes.

Offseason

NFL Draft

Summary 
Besides the entry of Johnson and Jones, the Cowboys made pre-season headlines by drafting UCLA quarterback Troy Aikman with the first pick in the NFL Draft. Curiously, they also drafted quarterback Steve Walsh later in the NFL's supplemental draft (in doing so, they gave up a number one pick in the 1990 draft).  Walsh had played quarterback for Jimmy Johnson at the University of Miami and led the ‘Canes to a 23–1 record as a starter and one national title.

Walsh and Aikman battled for the starting quarterback job in the pre-season, with Aikman winning the nod when the regular season began.  Expectations were raised when the Cowboys finished with a strong 3–1 preseason record.

On opening day, the Cowboys were beaten by the New Orleans Saints, 28–0, and went on to finish 1–15 for the season. Aikman broke the index finger on his non-throwing hand in week four and Steve Walsh started the next five games, including the team’s only win, before Aikman returned to finish the season.

Two of the few bright spots of the season were linebacker Eugene Lockhart, who led the league in tackles, and James Dixon, who was one of the NFL’s leaders in kickoff return average.

1989 was the first season in the history of Monday Night Football that did not feature at least one Cowboys game.

The only win by the Cowboys during the season was against the rival Redskins in Washington. Though the season seemed a complete failure, it would prove to be the prelude to many great years ahead. Troy Aikman and Michael Irvin, future centerpieces of the Cowboys’ 1992 to 1995 dynasty, headlined this team. During the season, star running back Herschel Walker would be traded to the Minnesota Vikings for multiple players and draft picks. By finishing 1–15 they would have received the top spot in the 1990 NFL Draft; however, the pick was forfeited because the Cowboys drafted Walsh in the Supplemental Draft. Later, they would trade and draft a running back out of Florida named Emmitt Smith, with one of the many draft choices obtained from the Vikings in the Herschel Walker trade. Other notable additions to the team that year include center Mark Stepnoski, fullback Daryl Johnston, and defensive end Tony Tolbert.

The two matchups between the Cowboys and Philadelphia Eagles (including one on Thanksgiving) were particularly hostile and became known as the Bounty Bowls.

The 1989 season was the final NFL season for the legendary Ed "Too Tall" Jones and longtime offensive lineman Tom Rafferty.

The Cowboys’ futility matched that of the 1980 New Orleans Saints as they became the second NFL team to end a season at 1–15.

Roster

Herschel Walker

In 1989, at the height of his NFL career, the Cowboys traded him to the Minnesota Vikings for a total of five players (LB Jesse Solomon, CB Issiac Holt, RB Darrin Nelson, LB David Howard, DE Alex Stewart) and six draft picks (which led to Emmitt Smith, Russell Maryland, Kevin Smith, and Darren Woodson). This was judged to be one of the turning points in the rise of the Cowboys to the top echelon of the NFL. Walker's trade was widely perceived as an exceptionally poor move considering what the Vikings had to give up in order to get him, and remains one of the most frequently vilified roster moves of the team's history. The Vikings coaches reluctantly accepted Walker after the trade and never totally used the tool they had been given.  Scout.com says "Walker was never used properly by the coaching brain trust (a total oxymoron in this case)".

Regular season

Schedule

Standings

Season summary

Week 5: at Green Bay Packers

Week 12 vs Eagles

"The Bounty Bowl"

Week 14: at Philadelphia Eagles

Publications
The Football Encyclopedia 
Total Football 
Cowboys Have Always Been My Heroes

References

External links
 1989 Dallas Cowboys
 Pro Football Hall of Fame
 Dallas Cowboys Official Site

Dallas Cowboys seasons
Dallas Cowboys
Dallas